DaQuan Marquel Jeffries (born August 30, 1997) is an American professional basketball player for the New York Knicks of the National Basketball Association (NBA). He played college basketball for the Oral Roberts Golden Eagles, the Western Texas Westerners, and the Tulsa Golden Hurricane.

College career
Jeffries-Fernando played at Western Texas College and Oral Roberts before transferring. Jeffries played two seasons of college basketball at Tulsa. As a senior, he averaged 13 points and 5.6 rebounds per game and was named to the Third-team All-American Athletic Conference. After the season, Jeffries took part in the Portsmouth Invitational Tournament.

Professional career
Originally projected as a second round pick, Jeffries- Fernando went undrafted in the 2019 NBA draft. He signed with the Orlando Magic on June 21, 2019. Reportedly, he declined a two-way deal in order to compete for a roster spot with the team. On October 19, 2019, the Magic released Jeffries.

Sacramento Kings (2019–2021)
Jeffries then signed a two-way contract with the Sacramento Kings on October 21, 2019. Under the terms of the deal he will split time between the Kings and their NBA G League affiliate, the Stockton Kings. On December 13, Jeffries tallied 44 points, nine rebounds and two blocks for Stockton in a victory over the Sioux Falls Skyforce. He suffered an undisclosed injury later in December.

On November 28, 2020, Jeffries was signed to a standard contract by the Kings. On April 3, 2021, Jeffries was waived by the Kings. He appeared in 31 games in two seasons.

Houston Rockets (2021)
On April 5, 2021, the Houston Rockets claimed Jeffries off waivers. On May 13, he was waived by the Rockets after 13 appearances.

College Park Skyhawks (2021–2022) 
On May 15, 2021, the San Antonio Spurs claimed Jeffries off waivers.

On October 7, 2021, the Atlanta Hawks signed Jeffries. However, he was waived on October 15. In October 2021, Jeffries signed with the College Park Skyhawks. He averaged 15.4 points and 2.4 rebounds per game.

Memphis Grizzlies (2022)
On January 1, 2022, Jeffries signed a 10-day contract with the Memphis Grizzlies via the hardship exemption. Jeffries appeared in three games during this stint, scoring 2 total points. On January 11, 2022, Jeffries was reacquired by the College Park Skyhawks.

Westchester Knicks (2022–2023)
On September 15, 2022, he signed with the New York Knicks, but was waived at the end of training camp. On October 24, 2022, Jeffries joined the Westchester Knicks training camp roster.

New York Knicks (2023–present)
On November 29, 2022, Jeffries signed a two-way contract with the New York Knicks after playing well for their NBA G League team, the Westchester Knicks. On March 5, 2023, the Knicks converted Jeffries' deal to a 10-day contract. On March 16, Jeffries was signed to a second 10-day contract.

Career statistics

NBA

Regular season

|-
| style="text-align:left;"|
| style="text-align:left;"|Sacramento
| 13 || 0 || 10.8 || .500 || .278 || .833 || 1.4 || .5 || .3 || .1 || 3.8
|-
| style="text-align:left;"|
| style="text-align:left;"|Sacramento
| 18 || 2 || 12.9 || .421 || .321 || .857 || 1.6 || .3 || .4|| .2|| 3.5
|-
| style="text-align:left;"|
| style="text-align:left;"|Houston
| 13 || 3 || 20.1 || .413 || .282 || 1.000 || 3.2 ||  1.2  || .6 || .5 || 4.9
|-
| style="text-align:left;"|
| style="text-align:left;"|Memphis
| 3 || 0 || 2.9 || .500 || .000 ||  || .7 || .3 || .0 || .0 || .7
|-
| style="text-align:center;" colspan="2"|Career
| 47 || 5 || 13.7 || .438 || .291 || .857 || 1.9 || .6 || .4 || .2 || 3.8

College

NCAA Division I

|-
| style="text-align:left;"|2015–16
| style="text-align:left;"|Oral Roberts
| 29 || 7 || 20.3 || .574 || .393 || .783 || 4.4 || .8 || .6 || .6 || 6.7
|-
| style="text-align:left;"|2017–18
| style="text-align:left;"|Tulsa
| 25 || 9 || 22.0 || .542 || .393 || .792 || 4.9 || .8 || .6 || 1.4 || 9.7
|-
| style="text-align:left;"|2018–19
| style="text-align:left;"|Tulsa
| 31 || 31 || 28.1 || .502 || .366 || .755 || 5.6 || 1.8 || 1.0 || 1.2 || 13.0
|- class="sortbottom"
| style="text-align:center;" colspan="2"|Career
| 85 || 47 || 23.6 || .530 || .377 || .770 || 5.0 || 1.2 || .8 || 1.1 || 9.9

JUCO

|-
| style="text-align:left;"|2016–17
| style="text-align:left;"|Western Texas
| 30 || 30 || 20.8 || .653 || .294 || .772 || 7.6 || 1.7 || 1.1 || .8 || 15.2

References

External links

 Oral Roberts Golden Eagles bio
 Western Texas Westerners bio
 Tulsa Golden Hurricane bio

1997 births
Living people
American men's basketball players
Basketball players from Oklahoma
College Park Skyhawks players
Houston Rockets players
Memphis Grizzlies players
Oral Roberts Golden Eagles men's basketball players
Sacramento Kings players
Shooting guards
Small forwards
Sportspeople from Edmond, Oklahoma
Stockton Kings players
Tulsa Golden Hurricane men's basketball players
Undrafted National Basketball Association players
United States men's national basketball team players
Westchester Knicks players
Western Texas Westerners men's basketball players